The 2009 US Open Players Championship was the third edition of the US Open tournament organised by the Professional Darts Corporation.

In 2009 the US Open became part of the PDC Pro Tour. The two prior editions were PDC Major events.

Dennis Priestley won the tournament, beating Andy Hamilton in the final.

Draw

References

External links

US Open Darts
US Open (darts)